Jibāl, also al-Jabal, was the name given by the Arabs to a region and province located in western Iran, under the Umayyad and Abbasid Caliphates.

Its name means "the Mountains", being the plural of jabal ("mountain"), highlighting the region's mountainous nature in the Zagros. Between the 12th and 14th centuries, the name Jibal was progressively abandoned, and it came to be mistakenly referred to as ʿIrāq ʿAjamī ("Persian Iraq") to distinguish it from "Arab Iraq" in Mesopotamia. The region never had any precisely defined boundaries, but was held to be bounded by the Maranjab Desert in the east, by Fars and Khuzistan in the south, by Iraq in the south-west and west, by Adharbayjan in the north-west and by the Alborz Mountains in the north, making it roughly coterminous with the ancient country of Media.

Under the Abbasid Caliphate, Jibal formed a separate province, with its capital usually at Rayy, until the Abbasids lost control in the early 10th century. For most of the 9th century, however, the area was ruled by an autonomous local dynasty, the Dulafids. In the late 10th and early 11th century, the larger portion of Jibal became one of the Buyid emirates, while the south passed to the Kakuyids.

The language spoken in Jibal was known as Pahlavi, known as Fahla or Bahla in Arabic records. Although Pahlavi literally means Parthian, the name had come to mean "heroic, old, ancient". "Pahlavi" most likely referred to a group of northwestern Iranian languages and dialects, which are still spoken today, such as Talysh, Southern Tati, or variants of Adhari.

References

Sources
 
 
 
 
 

 
Historical regions of Iran
Historical geography of Iran